Young God Records is an independent record label formed by Michael Gira in 1990 that specializes in experimental, avant-garde and often non genre-specific releases. The label was named after an EP released by Gira's band Swans called Young God.

The label's original intent was to facilitate the release of Swans' music, but while the band was disbanded Young God grew to host the Angels of Light as well as a number of other unique bands and artists, including: Akron/Family, Devendra Banhart, Lisa Germano, Ulan Bator, and Mi and L'au. Swans was re-formed in 2010, and began again releasing music under the Young God label. In 2012, Gira told Pitchfork that Young God would not be putting out any new albums by other bands, citing the decline in revenue.

List of artists
 Akron/Family
 The Angels of Light
 Devendra Banhart
 James Blackshaw
 The Body Lovers / The Body Haters
 Calla
 David Coulter
 Fire on Fire
 Flux Information Sciences
 Larkin Grimm
 Lisa Germano
 Mi and L'au
 Larsen
 Charlemagne Palestine / David Coulter / Jean Marie Mathoul
 Swans
 Ulan Bator
 Windsor for the Derby
 Wooden Wand

See also
 List of record labels

References

External links
 Official site
 Naturalismo Interview with Akron/Family
 Naturalismo Interview with Mi & L'au
 Naturalismo Interview with Fire on Fire
Naturalismo Interview with Larkin Grimm, November 2008

American independent record labels
Record labels established in 1990
Vanity record labels
Alternative rock record labels
Experimental music record labels
Swans (band)